This is a list of candidates for the 1920 New South Wales state election. The election was held on 20 March 1920. The election was the first of three conducted under the system of proportional representation; as a result, it is not possible to estimate the notional pre-election numbers.

Retiring Members

Labor
Claude Bushell MLA (Lyndhurst)
John Cochran MLA (Darling Harbour)

Nationalist
Alfred Edden MLA (Kahibah)
James Fallick MLA (Singleton)
David Hall MLA (Enmore) — appointed to the Legislative Council
John Hunt MLA (Camden)
William Latimer MLA (Woollahra) — appointed to the Legislative Council
Charles Lee MLA (Tenterfield)
George McDonald MLA (Bingara) — appointed to the Legislative Council
John Perry MLA (Byron)
William Robson MLA (Ashfield) — appointed to the Legislative Council
David Storey MLA (Randwick) — appointed to the Legislative Council
William Thompson MLA (Ryde)

Independent
Alexander Graff MLA (Drummoyne) — elected as a Nationalist but became an Independent in 1920

Legislative Assembly
Sitting members are shown in bold text. Successful parties are highlighted in the relevant colour. Successful candidates are indicated by an asterisk (*).

See also
 Members of the New South Wales Legislative Assembly, 1920–1922
 Results of the 1920 New South Wales state election

Notes

References

 

1920